Čelevec may refer to: 

Čelevec, North Macedonia, in the municipality of Demir Kapija
Čelevec, Šmarješke Toplice, Slovenia